Felix Roland Rossignol (October 18, 1920 – May 31, 1981) was a Canadian professional ice hockey forward who played 14 games in the National Hockey League for the Montreal Canadiens and Detroit Red Wings between 1944 and 1946. The rest of his career, which lasted from 1937 to 1963, was mainly spent in senior leagues. He was born in Edmundston, New Brunswick. Rossignol died in 1981 and is buried in Bathurst, New Brunswick.

Career statistics

Regular season and playoffs

References

External links
 
Mention of Felix Rossignol as deceased

1920 births
1981 deaths
Canadian expatriates in the United States
Canadian ice hockey forwards
Detroit Red Wings players
Ice hockey people from New Brunswick
Indianapolis Capitals players
Montreal Canadiens players
People from Edmundston
Pittsburgh Hornets players
Providence Reds players
Quebec Aces (QSHL) players
St. Louis Flyers players
Washington Eagles players